Abdullah Sulaiman Al-Akbary (born 2 March 1961) is an Omani sprinter. He competed in the men's 100 metres at the 1984 Summer Olympics.

References

External links

1961 births
Living people
Athletes (track and field) at the 1984 Summer Olympics
Omani male sprinters
Olympic athletes of Oman
Place of birth missing (living people)